Overbury is a village and civil parish in Worcestershire, England, midway between Evesham and Tewkesbury south of Bredon Hill.

The manor of Overbury was purchased by the banking family of Martin in the 18th century from the Parsons family, members of whom also owned neighbouring Kemerton Court. The Martins rebuilt Overbury Court in c.1740, and it is still occupied by their descendants in 2018.

In 2014, Roman skeletons were found at Overbury Primary School when extensions to the school were being built.

Conderton Camp

Conderton Camp, to the north of the village, is a scheduled monument. Kemerton Camp is also on Bredon Hill and is an Iron Age Hill Fort, brought to a "violent end" by the Romans and left abandoned for most of the Romano-British period.

References

Sources

External links 

 http://www.overbury.org/ Village website
 http://www.overburyenterprises.co.uk/ Company website
 http://www.overburyfarms.co.uk/ Company website

Villages in Worcestershire